Padangsidempuan (sometimes written as Padangsidimpuan or Padang Sidempuan) is a city in North Sumatra, Indonesia, and the former capital of South Tapanuli Regency, which surrounds the city. It has an area of 159.28 km² and a population of 178,818 people at the 2000 census, which rose to 191,554 in the 2010 census and 225,105 at the 2020 Census.

Administrative districts
The city is divided into six districts, tabulated below with their areas and their populations at the 2010 Census and the 2020 Census. The table also includes the number of administrative villages (desa and kelurahan) in each district and its post codes.

Note that "Padangsidempuan" is abbreviated to "PS" in the table above.

Climate
Padang Sidempuan has a tropical rainforest climate (Af) with moderate rainfall from June to August and heavy rainfall in the remaining months. The weather is mild throughout the years with rainy and sunny days.

References 

Populated places in North Sumatra
Cities in North Sumatra